Gregory John 'Bluey' Brazel (born 17 November 1954) is a convicted Australian serial killer, arsonist, and armed robber currently serving three consecutive life sentences for the murders of sex workers Sharon Taylor and Roslyn Hayward in 1990, and the murder of Mordialloc hardware store owner Mildred Hanmer during an armed robbery in 1982 to which he confessed some eighteen years later.

Brazel is often described as one of the most manipulative and violent prisoners in Victoria's prison system, and was estimated to be worth more than A$500,000 in 2000. He is eligible for parole in 2020 it is believed a parole submission request is already before the court for his release. This must be approved by a magistrate and if unsuccessful Brazel will need to wait approximately 3 years before reapplying.

Early life
Enlisted in the Australian Army in 1974. Trained at 1RTB (Kapooka) 14 Platoon B Company. Posted September 1974 to the Australian Army Medical Training School, Healesville, Victoria.

In 1976, Brazel took five privates hostage during an army medical corps exercise in Healesville. Shots were fired before Brazel was persuaded to release the hostages. He was later dishonorably discharged.

Murders

Sharon Taylor
On 28 May 1990, while on early release from prison, Brazel murdered sex worker Sharon Taylor. Her body was found in a shallow grave at Barongarook, Victoria, south of Colac on 23 September 1990.

Roslyn Hayward 
On 13 September 1990, Brazel murdered sex worker Roslyn Hayward at Sorrento. Her body was not discovered until 1 October 1990.

Mildred Hanmer 
Mildred Teresa Hanmer was shot in the chest on 20 September 1982 during an armed robbery at her Mordialloc hardware and gift store. She later died in the Alfred Hospital from her injuries. Her murder remained unsolved until August 2000.

On 18 August 2000, Brazel voluntarily confessed to the 1982 murder, seeking to make a deal with police officers that no life term would be imposed before agreeing to make a statement.

Prison life
Brazel has continued to regularly offend while imprisoned and is often described as being manipulative and violent. In November 1991, Brazel took a staff member hostage while imprisoned at the HM Melbourne Assessment Prison when he learned of his impending transfer to HM Prison Pentridge.

In 2003, Brazel conned an elderly woman into depositing more than A$30,000 into a TAB telephone betting account for his own personal use. In 2006, Brazel was awarded A$12,000 in damages in an out of court settlement after suffering a violent attack with a broken bottle while imprisoned at Melbourne's privately operated Port Phillip Correctional Centre in Laverton in May 2001. In October 2006, Brazel was caught collecting personal information relating to senior prison staff.

Brazel was assaulted by fellow inmates whilst detailed in the high security unit of HM Prison Barwon. Brazel sought County Court approval and, on appeal, was granted access to documents including a prison map and an incident report so he can sue the Victorian Government for failure to exercise reasonable care to protect him.

Summary of criminal convictions
During the period of March 1983 until August 2000 Brazel was convicted of 37 offences from fifteen court appearances. Offences since 1992 occurred while Brazel was in prison custody apart from the 2005 conviction for murder which occurred in 1982.

See also
List of serial killers by country

References

1954 births
1982 murders in Australia
1990 murders in Australia
Australian arsonists
Australian people convicted of murder
Australian prisoners sentenced to multiple life sentences
Australian serial killers
Australian soldiers
Living people
Male serial killers
People convicted of murder by Victoria (Australia)
Prisoners sentenced to life imprisonment by Victoria (Australia)